Dyring is a surname. Notable people with the surname include:

Lindsay Dyring (1919–2008), Australian rules footballer
Moya Dyring (1909–1967), Australian artist
Theodor Dyring (1916–1975), Norwegian politician
Victoria Dyring (born 1972), Swedish TV host and film producer